Diana Stoughton is an American set decorator. She was nominated for an Academy Award in the category Best Production Design for the film Ma Rainey's Black Bottom.

Selected filmography 
 Ma Rainey's Black Bottom (2020; co-nominated with Mark Ricker and Karen O'Hara)

References

External links 

Living people
Place of birth missing (living people)
Year of birth missing (living people)
American set decorators